Sara Ellison is an Astronomy Professor at University of Victoria. Her work involves observational extragalactic astronomy, galaxy mergers and evolution, galactic chemistry and active galactic nuclei.

Background and education 
Ellison was inspired to study astronomy by a teacher who was also an astronomer. The only student in a physics class in her small, all-girls school, Ellison finished the standard curriculum quickly and spent the remainder of class time discussing astronomy with her teacher.

Ellison enrolled in Physics and Space Science at the University of Kent in 1993 and received her MSc degree in Physics at this university in 1997. She went on to earn her PhD degree in Astronomy from University of Cambridge in 2000. After finishing her graduate studies, she worked as an ESO fellow in Chile for three years, and then joined the faculty of the University of Victoria as an Assistant Professor in 2003. The same year, she was selected as Canada Research Chair (Tier II), a grant given to extraordinary emerging researchers by the Canadian government. In 2008, she became an Associate Professor and in 2014 a full Professor at the University of Victoria.

Research 
The main themes of Ellison's research are studying absorption lines in quasar spectra and studying the effects of environment on galaxy evolution. Her quasar work has focused on studying the chemistry of gas along the line-of-sight to quasars such as Damped Lyman-alpha systems and the Lyman-alpha forest. Much of Ellison's most recent work has focused on using close pairs of galaxies in the Sloan Digital Sky Survey to investigate how galaxy interactions affect galaxy evolution.

Personal 
In addition to her work in astronomy, Ellison has been involved in science outreach since 1992. She appeared on CBC Radio's Quirks & Quarks to answer questions about lunar landing sites. In a 2015 interview with the Vancouver Sun, she spoke about how she got interested in astronomy. Her hobbies include painting on stretched canvas in acrylics. An accomplished amateur athlete, Ellison has a Boston Qualifying marathon time and age group wins in both running and triathlon.

Honours and awards
 2020-2022: President, Canadian Astronomical Society
2018-2020: Vice President, Canadian Astronomical Society
2015: Elected member of the Royal Society of Canada's College for New Scholars
 2014: Royal Society of Canada Rutherford Memorial medal in physics
 2009: Faculty of Science excellence in research award
 2007: NSERC Discovery Accelerator grant
 2004: Royal Astronomical Society of Canada Ovenden lecturer
 2004: American Astronomical Society Annie Jump Cannon Award in Astronomy
 2001: Royal Astronomical Society PhD thesis prize (runner-up)

References

Living people
Year of birth missing (living people)
Alumni of the University of Kent
Alumni of the University of Cambridge
Academic staff of the University of Victoria
Recipients of the Annie J. Cannon Award in Astronomy
21st-century Canadian women scientists
21st-century Canadian astronomers
Women astronomers
Place of birth missing (living people)
Canada Research Chairs
Canadian women physicists